Sven-Olof Walldoff (2 May 1929 – 7 June 2011) was a Swedish record producer, composer and orchestra conductor who is best known for conducting the orchestra for ABBA's song "Waterloo" for the Eurovision Song Contest 1974, wearing a Napoleon costume.

Walldoff also collaborated on ABBA's first album Ring Ring.

References
 http://www.discogs.com/artist/Sven-Olof+Walldoff

External links
 

1929 births
2011 deaths
Swedish conductors (music)
Male conductors (music)
Swedish composers
Swedish male composers
Swedish record producers
Swedish music arrangers